Takataki Dam is a gravity dam located in Chiba Prefecture in Japan. The dam is used for flood control and water supply. The catchment area of the dam is 107.1 km2. The dam impounds about 199  ha of land when full and can store 14300 thousand cubic meters of water. The construction of the dam was started on 1970 and completed in 1990.

References

Dams in Chiba Prefecture
1990 establishments in Japan